Al Jafree Md Yusop is a Malaysian writer and director of TV and feature films.

Biography
Al Jafree Md Yusop (b. 1966) studied in MARA Junior Science College Kuala Terengganu in 1979, before furthering his studies at UiTM in Arau, Perlis to secure a Diploma in Planting, Industry and Management. After a decade with International Islamic University Malaysia as an accountant and IT manager, he left full-time employment and began a 3-year period he refers to as "Proses Malas" (Malay for "lazy process") where he spent time watching films, reading and travelling.

Filmography

Feature films

Telemovies 
Al Jafree's involvement with telemovies:

Awards
His awards include:
 2007 Boh Cameronian Awards, Best Original Script for P. Ramlee The Musical 
 2016 21st Asian Television Awards (ATA), Best Telemovie for Tulus Ikhlas 
 2016 Anugerah Tribute P. Ramlee (Special Jury Prize) for Kembara Nak Dara 
 2018 Kuala Lumpur Film Critics Circle award for Mencari Rahmat

References

External links

1966 births
Living people
Malaysian people of Malay descent
Malaysian dramatists and playwrights
Malaysian film directors